The 2006–07 DFB-Pokal was the 64th season of the annual German football cup competition. 64 teams competed in the tournament of six rounds which began on 8 September 2006 and ended on 26 May 2007. In the final, 1. FC Nürnberg defeated VfB Stuttgart 3–2 after extra time, thereby claiming their fourth title.

Matches

First round

Second round

*Match abandoned on 86' after linesman was struck from the crowd; Result stood

Round of 16

Quarter-finals

Semi-finals

Final

References

External links
 Official site of the DFB 
 Kicker.de 

2006-07
2006–07 in German football cups